Rule 3:36 is the second studio album by American rapper Ja Rule. It was released on October 10, 2000, by Def Jam Recordings and Irv Gotti's Murder Inc. Records. The album features guest appearances from Christina Milian, Lil' Mo, Shade Sheist and Jayo Felony, with producers Irv Gotti (who also executive produced the album), Ty Fyffe, Tru Stylze, Lil Rob and Damizza contributing to the album. The album marked a significant change in Ja Rule's musical style, shifting from hardcore hip hop to a more radio-friendly pop rap oriented sound to greater success.

Rule 3:36 debuted atop of the US Billboard 200 with 276,000 copies sold in its first week and went on to be certified Triple Platinum by the Recording Industry Association of America (RIAA) on August 20, 2001, producing four singles; all of which had achieved varying degrees of chart success. The most successful single, "Put It On Me" featuring Vita, peaking at number 8 on the US Billboard Hot 100, becoming his first top-ten single on that chart as a lead artist, and scored his first nomination for Best Rap Performance by a Duo or Group at the 44th Grammy Awards.

Background
Rule 3:36 contains the song titled "Fuck You", which is titled "Furious" as a clean version for radio play. The song received average airplay, and is also on the soundtrack to The Fast and the Furious (where it is titled "Furious"). The disc is still mostly radio-friendly pop-themed music unlike his later albums, which contain disses of a more dark tone. The album still contains explicit material, and was made in a clean version which only removes profanity and drug/violent lyrics are left in, although some profanity like the words "hoes" and "ass" are also left in.

Reception
Rule 3:36 sold 276,000 during its first week. Initial critical response to Rule 3:36 was average. At Metacritic, which assigns a normalized rating out of 100 to reviews from mainstream critics, the album has received an average score of 56, based on 5 reviews. The album became a three-time platinum certified album by the Recording Industry Association of America (RIAA).

Track listing
Credits adapted from the album's liner notes.

 (co.) Co-producer

Charts

Weekly charts

Year-end charts

Certifications

See also
 List of Billboard 200 number-one albums of 2000
 List of Billboard number-one R&B albums of 2000

References

2000 albums
Ja Rule albums
Def Jam Recordings albums
Albums produced by Irv Gotti
Albums produced by Scott Storch